Better Things is an American comedy-drama television series created by Pamela Adlon and Louis C.K. for FX, starring Adlon as a divorced actress who raises her three daughters on her own. FX gave a 10-episode order on August 7, 2015. The series premiered on September 8, 2016. The series was renewed for a fifth and final season which premiered on February 28, 2022. The series concluded on April 25, 2022.

The series and Adlon's performance have been praised, and Adlon was nominated for a Primetime Emmy Award for Outstanding Lead Actress in a Comedy Series in 2017 and 2018. The show received a Peabody Award in April 2017, with the board stating: "[...] this searingly funny and beautiful show is an at-times raw examination of the vicissitudes of working motherhood, crackling with feminist verve and energy, that consistently cuts new ground".

Cast

Main
 Pamela Adlon as Sam Fox, a single mother and working actress raising three daughters in Los Angeles.
 Mikey Madison as Max Fox, Sam's volatile and angry but essentially decent oldest daughter.
 Hannah Alligood as Frankie Fox, Sam's strong-willed middle child.
 Olivia Edward as Duke Fox, Sam's adorable and sweet-hearted youngest daughter.
 Celia Imrie as Phyllis "Phil" Darby, Sam's British mother with some looming physical and mental issues.

Recurring
 Diedrich Bader as Rich, Sam's best friend, who is gay and has about the same amount of luck with men as Sam does
 Alysia Reiner as Sunny, Sam's newly divorced best friend
 Greg Cromer as Jeff, Sunny's pot-smoking and lazy ex-husband
 Rebecca Metz as Tressa, Sam's understated and very competent manager and friend
 Matthew Glave as Xander Hall, Sam's ex-husband and Max, Frankie, and Duke's absentee father
 Mather Zickel as one of Sam's ex-boyfriends
 Lucy Davis as Macy, Sam's close friend who has serious personal problems (seasons 1–2)
 Patricia Scanlon as Joy, one of Sam's friends (seasons 1–2)
 Emma Shannon as Pepper, Duke's friend (seasons 1–5)
 Kevin Pollak as Marion, Sam's brother (seasons 2–5)
 Jeremy K. Williams as Jason, Frankie's friend (seasons 2–5)
 Alex Désert as Donte, an actor who has worked with Sam in a car commercial and in Monsters in the Moonlight (seasons 2–3)
 Henry Thomas as Robin, a single father and Sam's boyfriend (season 2)
 Judy Reyes as Lala, Sam's friend (seasons 3–5)
 Cree Summer as Lenny, Sam's friend (seasons 3–5)
 Matthew Broderick as Dr. David Miller, Sam's therapist with whom Sam becomes romantically involved (season 3)
 Janina Gavankar as Nikki, an assistant director on Monsters in the Moonlight (season 3)
 Marsha Thomason as Mer Kodis, a talent manager who shows romantic interest in Sam (season 3)
 Kris Marshall as Tibor, director of Monsters in the Moonlight (season 3)
 Doug Jones as himself, an actor in Monsters in the Moonlight (season 3)
 Harrison Page as Walter, Phil's boyfriend (season 3)
 Adam Kulbersh as Murray Fox, Sam's father who appears as a ghost to her and Duke (season 3; guest season 5)
 Judy Gold as Chaya, one of Sam's friends (seasons 4–5)
 Mario Cantone as Mal Martone, Sam's new manager (seasons 4–5)
 Rosalind Chao as Caroline, Marion's wife (seasons 4–5)

Notable guest stars

Production and development

The pilot was ordered by FX on January 18, 2015. It was written by Louis C.K. and Pamela Adlon, and directed by Louis C.K. The story is semi-autobiographically based on Adlon's life. 
The pilot was picked up for a 10-episode first season on August 7, 2015.

The show is named after the song "Better Things" by The Kinks.

On September 20, 2016, FX renewed the series for a second season, which premiered on September 14, 2017. In October 2017, FX renewed the series for a third season, which premiered on February 28, 2019, and consisted of 12 episodes, all directed by Adlon. In November 2017, after Louis C.K. confirmed the sexual misconduct allegations against him were true, FX canceled their overall deal with C.K. and his production company, Pig Newton. It was announced that C.K. would have no involvement in future seasons of the series. That month, Adlon fired 3 Arts manager Dave Becky as her manager. Pig Newton and 3 Arts no longer co-produced the series after the Season 2 finale. For the third season, Adlon hired four new writers for the series, Sarah Gubbins, Joe Hortua, Robin Ruzan, and Ira Parker.

In March 2019, the series was renewed for a 10-episode fourth season that premiered on March 5, 2020. In May 2020, the series was renewed for a fifth season, which was announced to be its last in October 2021.

Podcast
Adlon launched a podcast titled Better Things with Pamela Adlon during the show's final season. The goal was to give insight to the creative process behind the show. Constructed as a companion to the final season, it featured guests like Diedrich Bader, Kevin Pollak, Olivia Edward, and Celia Imrie.

Episodes

Season 1 (2016)

Season 2 (2017)

Season 3 (2019)

Season 4 (2020)

Season 5 (2022)

Reception

Critical response
The series received an overall score of 98% on Rotten Tomatoes and 88 on Metacritic.

The first season has a Metacritic score of 80 out of 100 based 31 reviews, indicating "generally favorable reviews". Rotten Tomatoes gave the first season a 95% "Certified Fresh" score with an average rating of 8.2 out of 10 based on 57 critic reviews, with the critical consensus "Pamela Adlon's Better Things abstains from traditional sitcom sendups and forges a path all its own – in this bawdy, often hilarious and bittersweet ode to the daily highs and lows of being a single mother."

The second season has a Metacritic score of 96 out of 100 based on 13 reviews, indicating "universal acclaim". On Rotten Tomatoes, it has a 96% approval rating with an average rating of 9.2 out of 10 based on 26 reviews, with the critical consensus "Better Things second season plays even more adroitly to its strengths, weaving confidently between stinging humor, caustic observation, and poignant drama." In his review for Time, Daniel D'Addario wrote, "This is a huge leap forward for a show that was already quite strong. Adlon comes as close to a pure auteur as TV gets. That her story is one imbued with both sadness and light makes Better Things one of television's very best shows—in any genre." Better Things is ranked as the seventh best TV series of 2017, according to Metacritic's list which tallies "best of" lists from various major TV critics and publications.

The third season has a Metacritic score of 94 out of 100 based on 19 reviews, indicating "universal acclaim". On Rotten Tomatoes, it has a 100% approval rating with an average rating of 9.3 out of 10 based on 35 reviews with the critical consensus, "Pamela Adlon fully asserts her authorial voice over Better Things in a triumphant third season that examines the exhaustion of motherhood with exhilarating artistry." Matt Zoller Seitz of Vulture wrote, "Better Things is the best the show has ever been." Caroline Framke of Variety wrote, "Better Things feels a bit freer to be its most audacious self this season. Making the show under extraordinary pressure has, in the end, allowed Adlon to throw up her hands, say anything she wants, get it all out there and succeed entirely on her own terms."

The fourth season has a Metacritic score of 90 out of 100 based on 6 reviews, indicating "universal acclaim". On Rotten Tomatoes, it has a 100% approval rating with an average rating of 8.5 out of 10 based on 21 reviews with the critical consensus, "Sharp and singular, Better Things just keeps getting better." Dan Fienberg of The Hollywood Reporter called the series "still one of the very best things on TV". Ben Travers of IndieWire gave it an "A" grade and summarized that season 4 is "an experience like nothing else on television."

The fifth season has a Metacritic score of 94 out of 100 based on 12 reviews, indicating "universal acclaim". On Rotten Tomatoes, it has a 100% approval rating with an average rating of 9.1 out of 10 based on 12 reviews with the critical consensus, "Bittersweet, funny as ever, and brimming with wisdom, Better Thingss final sendoff is as good as it gets." Jen Chaney of Vulture called it "one of the most generous, organic, and beautiful works of the past decade."

Accolades

References

External links
 
 

2010s American comedy-drama television series
2010s American black comedy television series
2016 American television series debuts
2010s American LGBT-related comedy television series
2010s American LGBT-related drama television series
2020s American comedy-drama television series
2020s American black comedy television series
2020s American LGBT-related comedy television series
2020s American LGBT-related drama television series
2022 American television series endings
English-language television shows
FX Networks original programming
Peabody Award-winning television programs
Television series created by Louis C.K.
Television series about single parent families
Television series by 3 Arts Entertainment
Television series by 20th Century Fox Television
Television shows set in Los Angeles
Television series about actors
Transgender-related television shows